The Only Number That Matters Is Won is the second collaborative studio album by American emcee/producer duo Pace Won and Mr. Green. It was released on September 4, 2012, via Raw Poetix Records LLC. The album features guest appearances from Masta Ace, Lee $cratch Perry, Snoop Dogg, Burnt MD, Lawrence Arnell, Rival.

It was supported by two music videos, "Ever Since" and "Something To Say".

Track listing 

Sample credits
"Liquor & Drugs" sampled "Music For The Funeral Of Queen Mary, Z 860" by Henry Purcell (1695) and "I'm Glad You're Mine" by Al Green (1972)
"Something To Say" sampled "No Equal" by The Beatnuts (1993), "Side A" by DJ Craze (2000) and "It's Funky Enough" by The D.O.C. (1989)
"My God" sampled "Cussin', Cryin' and Carryin' On" by Ike & Tina Turner (1969), "They Reminisce Over You (T.R.O.Y.)" by Pete Rock & C.L. Smooth (1992), "Juicy" by Notorious B.I.G. & Total (1994)
"My Song" sampled "My Song" by Labi Siffre (1972) and "Humpty Dump" by The Vibrettes (1973)
"Insecure" sampled "Book Of Rhymes" by Nas (2002) and "Get Out of My Life, Woman" by Lee Dorsey (1966)

Personnel 
 Aaron Green – producer
 Hans Dekline – mastering
 J.Def – mixing

References

External links 

2012 albums
Outsidaz albums